Anguillara Veneta is a comune (municipality) in the Province of Padua in the Italian region Veneto, located about  southwest of Venice and about  south of Padua. The city is known for being the town of origin of the Bolsonaro family, a prominent Brazilian political clan.

Jair Bolsonaro was recognized as honorary citizen by the city council of Anguillara Veneta on 25 October 2021. This measure has aroused reactions in Italy.

Anguillara Veneta borders the following municipalities: Agna, Bagnoli di Sopra, Boara Pisani, Cavarzere, Pozzonovo, Rovigo, San Martino di Venezze, Tribano.

The actor José Quaglio (1926–2007) was born in Anguillara Veneta.

Gallery

References

Cities and towns in Veneto